Budnick Hill is a small, rounded hill on the south side of Newcomb Bay on Budd Coast. The hill rises between Crane Cove and Geoffrey Bay and is joined by a narrow strip of land to the northern part of the Bailey Peninsula. It was first mapped from U.S. Navy Operation Highjump air photos of 1946–47, and named by the Antarctic Names Committee of Australia for K. Budnick, Australian National Antarctic Research Expeditions surveyor in 1964 at Wilkes Station, who set up a trigonometrical station on the hill.

References
 

Hills of Antarctica
Landforms of Wilkes Land